Brittany Phelan (born September 24, 1991) is a Canadian freestyle skier who competes in ski cross. She was formerly an alpine skier, specializing in slalom skiing.  She won the silver medal in women's ski cross at the 2018 Winter Olympics in Pyeongchang.

Career
Phelan represented Canada at the 2014 Winter Olympics, where she finished 15th in the slalom. However, she suffered injuries during the following season, which led to a drop in her World Cup ranking, and led her to follow in the footsteps of several other Canadian alpine skiers such as Louis-Pierre Hélie, Brady Leman, Kelsey Serwa and Georgia Simmerling by switching to ski cross.

In December 2016, she set a new personal best in ski cross when she finished eleventh at a World Cup competition in Val Thorens, following it up by setting another personal best by finishing seventh in the first of two rounds at Innichen later that month. Since 2013, Brittany is part of the Tremblant athletes ambassadors program.

At the 2018 Winter Olympics, Phelan made it to the final race of the ski cross event.  At one point in fourth place, she passed Sandra Näslund and Fanny Smith to finish in second place behind teammate Serwa.

References

1991 births
Alpine skiers at the 2014 Winter Olympics
Freestyle skiers at the 2018 Winter Olympics
Freestyle skiers at the 2022 Winter Olympics
Canadian female alpine skiers
Canadian female freestyle skiers
Living people
People from Sainte-Agathe-des-Monts
Sportspeople from Quebec
Olympic alpine skiers of Canada
Olympic freestyle skiers of Canada
Olympic medalists in freestyle skiing
Olympic silver medalists for Canada
Medalists at the 2018 Winter Olympics